Ferran Sibila (born 13 July 1988) is a Spanish football coach who was most recently assistant coach of English Championship club Barnsley. Prior to this, he was the assistant coach of Allsvenskan club IFK Göteborg. 

On 3 September 2020, after the then head coach Poya Asbaghi was sacked, Sibila was appointed caretaker head coach of IFK Göteborg.

References

External links
 

1988 births
Living people
Spanish football managers
IFK Göteborg managers
Allsvenskan managers
Spanish expatriate football managers
Spanish expatriate sportspeople in Sweden
Expatriate football managers in Sweden